Green Green Grass by the River is a 1992 Taiwanese television drama series based on Chiung Yao's novel of the same name. The series was filmed in Yangzhou and Nanjing, China.

Synopsis
Xiao Cao is a young orphan living with her cruel aunt and uncle. She has a sisterly bond with her neighbour, Qing Qing, who is being forced into a marriage with a much older man by her older brother. Desperate to escape their unfortunate circumstances, the two girls manage to run away together on the day of Qing Qing's wedding. During their escape they coincidentally meet He Shiwei, a young university student who is also running away from his family due to an arranged marriage. After a few initial misunderstandings the three decide to travel together. However, things become complicated when they encounter the Fu family, and the family matriarch mistakes He Shiwei for her son, Fu Yuankai, who died 10 years ago.

Cast
Yue Ling as Qing Qing
Steve Ma as He Shiwei
Jin Ming as Xiao Cao
Yue Yueli as Fu Zhenting
Gui Yalei as Jing Zhi
Wang Zhixia as Yue Niang
Liu Ziwei as Pei Shao Qian
Ye Jing as Pei Shaowen
He Yin as Shi Liu
He Qing as Hua You Lin
Leanne Liu as Zhu Shulan
Xu Nailin as Fu Yuankai

References

1992 Taiwanese television series debuts
1992 Taiwanese television series endings
Chinese Television System original programming
Mandarin-language television shows
Television shows based on works by Chiung Yao